Getting to the Point is the second studio album by the British blues rock band Savoy Brown. It marks the debut of a vastly different lineup, still led by Kim Simmonds but fronted by new vocalist Chris Youlden.

It was released by Decca in 1968 with catalog number SKL 4935 and finds the group taking on more of the songwriting load, as opposed to their debut, which consisted mostly of covers. One of the covers is "You Need Love" by Willie Dixon, which served as a blueprint for "Whole Lotta Love" by Led Zeppelin. Deram released the cd with three bonus tracks in 1990 with catalog number 820 922-2.

Track listing
 "Flood in Houston" (Kim Simmonds, Chris Youlden) – 4:00
 "Stay with Me Baby" (Dave Peverett, Simmonds, Youlden) – 2:35
 "Honey Bee" (Muddy Waters) – 6:25
 "The Incredible Gnome Meets Jaxman" (Simmonds) – 3:30
 "Give Me a Penny" (Traditional; arranged by Simmonds and Youlden) – 4:20
 "Mr. Downchild" (Simmonds, Youlden) – 5:25
 "Getting to the Point" (Simmonds) – 4:20
 "Big City Lights" (Bob Hall, Youlden) – 3:25
 "You Need Love" (Willie Dixon) – 7:40

Bonus tracks on 1990 CD release
 "Walking by Myself" (Jimmy Rogers) – 2:25 (originally A-side of Decca F 12797)
 "Taste and Try, Before You Buy" (Youlden) – 2:21 (originally A-side of Decca F 12702)
 "Someday People" (Simmonds) –  4:35 (originally B-side of Decca F 12702)

Personnel

Savoy Brown
 Chris Youlden – vocals     
 Bob Hall – piano
 Kim Simmonds – lead guitar
 Dave Peverett – rhythm guitar
 Rivers Jobe – bass guitar (except on tracks 11 and 12)
 Roger Earl – drums (except on tracks 11 and 12)
 Bob Brunning – bass guitar (on tracks 11 and 12)
 Hughie Flint – drums (on tracks 11 and 12)

Technical
 Mike Vernon – producer
 Roy Thomas Baker - recording engineer
 Harry Fisher - mastering engineer
 Neil Slaven – liner notes

References

External links
Savoy Brown's Homepage

1968 albums
Savoy Brown albums
Albums produced by Mike Vernon (record producer)
Decca Records albums